Pennai Vazha Vidungal is a 1969 Indian Tamil-language drama film directed and edited by R. Devarajan, and produced by M. Karnan who also handled the cinematography. It was released on 1 August 1969, and emerged a commercial success.

Plot 

The film revolves around the change of heart of a wayward husband due to his submissive but just wife who, as a lawyer, fights for the rights of her own bigamous husband's other wife who has been deceived and maligned due to his promiscuity. The other woman eventually dies, thereby allowing the family to remain intact.

Cast 
 Jaishankar as Anand 
 K. R. Vijaya Amudha
 Sheela as Shanathi
 Nagesh as Natarajan
 M. R. R. Vasu as Vasu
 V. K. Ramasamy as Singarapillai
 S. V. Sahasranamam
 V. S. Raghavan
 M. S. Sundari Bai
O. A. K. Thevar
 Shylashri as Shyla
 Vijayachandrika as Parvathi
 Ramamoorthy as Nagarajan
Karikol Raju as Chithambaram

Production 
Pennai Vazha Vidungal, made under the Vijaya Chithra Films banner, is the inaugural production of M. Karnan who also handled the cinematography. The film was directed by R. Devarajan who also handled the editing.

Soundtrack 
The soundtrack was composed by S. M. Subbaiah Naidu, and the lyrics were written by Kannadasan.

Release and reception 
Pennai Vazha Vidungal was released on 1 August 1969, and emerged a commercial success. The Indian Express wrote, "The movie has many an interesting melodramatic moment."

References

Bibliography

External links 
 

1960s Tamil-language films
1969 drama films
Films scored by S. M. Subbaiah Naidu
Indian drama films